Giannis Ioannidis (alternate spellings: Ioannis, Yiannis, Yannis) (Greek: Γιάννης Ιωαννίδης; born 26 February 1945 in Thessaloniki, Greece) is a former Greek basketball player, professional basketball coach, and Greece New Democracy (ND) politician. Ioannidis is generally considered to be the best Greek professional basketball club head coach of all-time, since he is the one with the most top-tier level major Greek national club titles won (19 in total, 14 with Aris, and 5 with Olympiacos).

Biography
Ioannidis was born in Thessaloniki, and studied Agriculture in the Faculty of Geotechnical Sciences at the Aristotle University of Thessaloniki.  He is married and has one daughter.

Basketball career

Playing career
During his youth, Ioannidis became a member of the youth clubs of Aris, in 1959. He joined the senior men's team of Aris, of the Greek Basket League, in 1960. He played with Aris in the Greek League, until 1978, when he retired. With 4,970 points scored as a member of Aris, he is the second highest scorer of all-time in the history of the club, after Nikos Galis.

Coaching career
Still in his playing years, Ioannidis agreed to assume the head coach position at Cretan club Ergotelis in 1977, after being offered the job by longtime friend and fellow Aristotle University of Thessaloniki student Manolis Nikiforakis. Travelling back and forth between Thessaloniki and Crete, Ioannidis managed to promote the club to the Greek B Basket League.

After retiring from playing basketball, Ioannidis became a full-time basketball coach. He eventually became the head coach of Aris, and with the club, he won a total of eight Greek League championships, five Greek Cups, and one Greek Super Cup. With Aris, he also participated at three consecutive FIBA European Champions' Cup (EuroLeague) Final Fours. Later, he coached Olympiacos, where he won four consecutive Greek League championships, a Greek Cup, and also participated at two consecutive editions of the FIBA EuroLeague's Finals.

He was the architect of the most glorious victory of Olympiacos, which came against Panathinaikos, in the last game of the 1995–96 Greek League Finals, with a winning score of 73–38. That was his last game coaching with Olympiacos at that time. The next year, he joined AEK, where he stayed for two seasons, and with them he managed to reach one more Final of the FIBA EuroLeague. After a short come-back to Olympiacos, he finished his coaching career with the senior men's Greek national team, which he coached at the 2003 EuroBasket.

Teams coached
 Ergotelis: 1977
 Aris: 1978–79
 G.S. Larissas: 1979–81
 Greece: 1980–81
 Aris: 1982–90
 Olympiacos: 1991–96
 AEK: 1996–98
 Olympiacos: 1999–00
 Greece: 2002–03

Awards and accomplishments

As a head coach

Titles won
12× Greek League Champion: 1979, 1983, 1985, 1986, 1987, 1988, 1989, 1990 (with Aris), 1993, 1994, 1995, 1996 (with Olympiacos)
6× Greek Cup Winner: 1985, 1987, 1988, 1989, 1990 (with Aris), 1994 (with Olympiacos)
Greek Super Cup Winner: 1986, (with Aris)
Greek 2nd Division Champion: 1980 (with Gymnastikos)

Other honors
3× Greek League Runner-Up: 1984 (with Aris), 1992 (with Olympiacos), 1997 (with AEK)
2× Greek Cup Runner-Up: 1984 (with Aris), 1998 (with AEK)
3× EuroLeague Finals Runner-Up: 1994, 1995 (with Olympiacos), 1998 (with AEK)
6× EuroLeague Final Four Appearance: 1988, 1989, 1990, (with Aris) 1994, 1995 (with Olympiacos), 1998 (with AEK)

Political career
Ioannidis announced his retirement from professional basketball in the year 2004, before he was elected a New Democracy MP for the Thessaloniki A constituency in the 2004 general election, and re-elected in 2007. Since September 2007, he has been Deputy Minister Of Culture Responsible for Sports.

In the 2014 regional election, he challenged incumbent Apostolos Tzitzikostas as Regional Governor of Central Macedonia, after Tzitzikostas had lost his party's support. He was however clearly defeated in the second round. At the January 2015 legislative election, he also lost his parliamentary seat.

References

External links
Giannis Ioannidis website

The top of the Greek bench: Giannis Ioannidis 
Hellenic Federation Profile 

1945 births
Living people
AEK B.C. coaches
Aris B.C. coaches
Aris B.C. players
Basketball players from Thessaloniki
Ergotelis B.C. coaches
Greece national basketball team coaches
Greek basketball coaches
Greek Macedonians
Greek men's basketball players
Greek MPs 2004–2007
Greek MPs 2007–2009
Greek MPs 2009–2012
Greek MPs 2012 (May)
Greek MPs 2012–2014
Greek sportsperson-politicians
Gymnastikos S. Larissas B.C. coaches
MPs of Thessaloniki
New Democracy (Greece) politicians
Olympiacos B.C. coaches
Point guards
Sport in Thessaloniki